Arsen Harutyunyan (born 16 March 1968) is an Armenian alpine skier. He competed at the 1998 Winter Olympics and the 2002 Winter Olympics.

References

1968 births
Living people
Armenian male alpine skiers
Olympic alpine skiers of Armenia
Alpine skiers at the 1998 Winter Olympics
Alpine skiers at the 2002 Winter Olympics
People from Tsaghkadzor